Norman Fraser Falkiner (20 November 1872 – 11 May 1929) was an Australian politician.

He was born in Ararat to grazier Frank Sadlier Falkiner and Emily Elizabeth Bazeley. He attended Geelong Grammar School and managed his father's stations at Jerilderie. In April 1901 he married Mary Louise Smithwick, with whom he had seven children. From 1915 he became a grazier of his own accord, and was a successful breeder of thoroughbred racehorses. In 1928 he was elected to the Victorian Legislative Assembly as a Nationalist for Melbourne South Province, but he died in London the following year. His brother Franc Falkiner and nephew Otway Falkiner were also politicians.

References

1872 births
1929 deaths
Nationalist Party of Australia members of the Parliament of Victoria
Members of the Victorian Legislative Council
People educated at Geelong Grammar School